Samuel Delgado Serna (born 2 July 1993), known as Samu Delgado or simply Samu, is a Spanish footballer who plays for Córdoba CF as a right winger.

Club career
Born in Belmonte, Cuenca, Castilla-La Mancha, Samu graduated from Albacete Balompié's youth setup, and made senior debuts with the reserves in the 2011–12 campaign, in Tercera División. In the following season he began appearing with the main squad in Segunda División B.

Samu was definitely promoted to the first team in July 2013, and appeared in 31 matches as Alba returned to Segunda División after a three-year absence. On 24 August 2014 he played his first match as a professional, replacing Portu in a 2–3 home loss against AD Alcorcón.

Samu scored his first professional goal on 30 November, netting the last in a 2–1 away win against FC Barcelona B. On 11 July 2016, after suffering relegation, he was loaned to fellow league team AD Alcorcón for one year.

Samu joined the Alfareros permanently on 31 January 2017, and was immediately loaned to Cultural Leonesa in the third division.

Honours
Cultural Leonesa
Segunda División B: 2016–17

References

External links

1993 births
Living people
Sportspeople from Albacete
Spanish footballers
Footballers from Castilla–La Mancha
Association football midfielders
Segunda División players
Segunda División B players
Tercera División players
Atlético Albacete players
Albacete Balompié players
AD Alcorcón footballers
Cultural Leonesa footballers
Marbella FC players
Córdoba CF players